Isle-Aumont is a commune in the Aube department in the Grand Est region,  France.

Population

See also
Communes of the Aube department

References

Communes of Aube
Aube communes articles needing translation from French Wikipedia